Intelligence and National Security is a peer-reviewed academic journal focused on  the role of intelligence in international relations and politics. The journal was established in 1986 by Christopher Andrew and Michael I. Handel as the first academic journal that publishes research on intelligence's role in national security and international affairs  and is published by Routledge. In 1990 the consulting editor of the journal was Oleg Gordievsky. As of 2017 the editors were Mark Phythian and Stephen Marrin.

References

External links
 

Taylor & Francis academic journals
Publications established in 1986
English-language journals
Political science journals
Military journals
Non-fiction works about espionage
7 times per year journals